Vinay Sheel Oberoi (18 February 1957 – 11 April 2020) was an IAS Officer of the 1979 batch. He belonged to the  Assam-Meghalaya Cadre. Oberoi served as the Ambassador & Permanent Representative of India to UNESCO from 2010 to 2014, as well as Secretary to the Government of India, in the Ministry of Women and Child Development, and in the Department of Higher Education, Ministry of Human Resources Development.

Education
Oberoi studied at The Doon School and St. Stephen's College, Delhi. He had a postgraduate degree in Economics from the Delhi School of Economics. Oberoi was the president of the Delhi School of Economics Students Union from 1977-78.

Early career 
Oberoi taught economics at Ramjas College, Delhi University, before joining the Indian Administrative Service (IAS) in 1979. He was one of the youngest officers in his batch, having cleared the entrance exam in his first try itself. Allotted to the Assam-Meghalaya cadre, he served in the field through several postings, starting as a Sub Divisional Magistrate (SDM) in Barpeta and later became the District Magistrate when Barpeta became a district.  Later he served  in the Assam Secretariat, in the Finance, Home and Political Departments.

He was transferred to the Central Government to the Department of Economic Affairs (1986–90). Assigned to the Policy desk for the World Bank, Oberoi was additionally entrusted with developing social sector projects and loans; and completed negotiations for India's first education loan (vocational education) in March 1990.  In 1990, Oberoi returned to Assam as Secretary, Finance Department.

In May 1993, he was deputed to the Central Government, in the Ministry of Defence, as Director (International Cooperation). Oberoi was the nodal point for UN and international organizations on peacekeeping operations, measures for conventional disarmament, restraint on land mine usage, and restrictions on us of other laser weapons deemed to be excessively injurious.

From 1996-2001, Oberoi worked with the United Nations Development Programme (UNDP) in India as the Chief (Industry and Technology), essentially with projects in the small scale sector, and in conjunction with the UNIDO on technology assimilation.

In 2002, he was tasked with establishing and chairing the National Mission on Bamboo Applications. In this role, Oberoi steered the development of non traditional products and promoted the manufacture, usage and applications in fields as diverse as engineered bamboo for structural applications, charcoal, activated carbon, and gasifiers to generate electricity and thermal energy.

In 2007, Oberoi returned to Meghalaya as Agriculture Production Commissioner. His efforts for this hill state were inevitably focused on horticulture, facilities to provide quality planting material, training technology services and aggregation support for commercialization, especially for key green-house based and high value crops. He was additionally assigned to the Border Areas, Urban Development, Public Health, Forest, and Sericulture departments. His instrumental role in the speedy establishment of the National Institute of Fashion Technology (NIFT), Shillong was widely appreciated within the state and beyond.

Ambassador and Permanent Representative of India to UNESCO 
In 2010, Oberoi was assigned as the Ambassador and Permanent Representative of India to UNESCO.  Oberoi served in this role with great distinction, and ensured the election of India to the major decision making bodies in different sectors, including to the Executive Board (2013-2017), the World Heritage Committee (2011-2015), the International Oceanographic Mission, and Intangible Cultural Heritage. In the Education sector, Oberoi represented India on major discussions on the Post 2015 Agenda for Education, and coordinated the E9 group of countries, and the G77 and China as Chairperson.

Oberoi lent his expertise on World Heritage even after retirement. In 2019, he was appointed as an advisor to the Government of Rajasthan ahead of Jaipur's nomination to the World Heritage Committee—successfully securing the nomination of the city of Jaipur on the world heritage list . Oberoi has also edited a book on World Heritage along with Shikha Jain, forthcoming in 2020.

Secretary to the Government of India
In 2014, Oberoi returned to New Delhi to serve as  Secretary, Women and Child Development from 2014-2015. Within the year, a slew of initiatives were developed, including the Beti Bachao, Beti Padhao Programme—a multi-faceted set initiatives to correct the child sex ratio and uplift the status and protection of women. The Juvenile Justice Bill (subsequently adopted) was steered to finalization, as was a programme for protection of child rights and elimination of child-trafficking.

In 2015, Oberoi was transferred to the Ministry of Human Resource Development, as Secretary, Higher Education. His term saw the launch of the National Institute Ranking Framework, and SWAYAM, across academic disciplines and stages of education. IMPRINT came into being, a pan IIT+ IISc joint initiative to address the major science and engineering challenges faced by the industry.

Post Retirement 
On 21 September 2017, Oberoi was appointed as an Independent Director of the Bharat Petroleum Corporation Limited.

In April, it was announced that Mr. Oberoi would also be the Chairperson of the seven member High Power Committee formed to examine the process of CBSE class examinations, with a view to prevent leakages. In 2018, Oberoi joined Jio Institute as an advisor. He was also an advisor to various other institutions, including Pearl Academy, Apparel Export Promotion Council, the Indo-Bhutan Dialogue, the Duke of Edinburgh's Award Scheme, the National Crafts Museum and more.

Passion For The North East 
Oberoi harbored a deep commitment to the North Eastern states of India, and worked for the development of the region even beyond his professional responsibilities.

Oberoi was the executive producer of "In The Forest Hangs A Bridge", a documentary film that tells the story of the making of a 1000 foot long suspension bridge made in the Damro Village of the Siang region in Arunachal Pradesh. The film won the Golden Lotus—Swarma Kamal" at the National Film Awards, 2000 for the best non-feature/documentary film of the year.

After retirement, he combined his interest in photography and the West Kameng region of Arunachal Pradesh into a book, to be published by Roli books. In October 2018, Oberoi's photographs of the Monpa people of Arunachal Pradesh were also exhibited as part of the "‘Experiencing the North East" festival held at India International Centre, New Delhi.

He was also the Chief Patron of the Motor Sports Club of Arunachal Pradesh, promoting the sport of motor rallying in North East India, and one of the founding members of the Siang Rush festival.

References

1957 births
Indian Administrative Service officers
Delhi University alumni
The Doon School alumni
Delhi School of Economics alumni
Living people